Mere Genie Uncle is an Indian 3D movie directed by Ashish Bhavsar and produced by Raju Gada, Ashish BHavsar and Paresh Mehta. The film stars Tiku Talsania, Swati Kapoor, Shakti Kapoor and Ehsaan Qureshi.

Cast
 Tiku Talsania as Genie & I M Patel
 Swati Kapoor as Ria Bannerjee
 Anuj Sikri as Sidd Patel
 Shakti Kapoor as Jr. Jaffar
 Ehsaan Qureshi as Sher Khan
 Navina Bole as Haseena Mallik
 Mushtaq Khan as ATS officer Salunkhe
 Asheish Roy as Guru Ganguly
 Pankaj Kalra as Dhondu Bhai
 Pratham Kalra as Montu
 Yash Acharya as Don
 Ayyan Mallik as Happy Singh
 Jenna Khan as Ronnie
 Hetvi Charla as Beena

Soundtrack 
All Songs are composed and Penned by Vandana Vadhera.

References

External links
 

2010s Hindi-language films
Indian 3D films
Indian fantasy films
Genies in film
2015 3D films
2015 fantasy films